Adam Adrian Casey (born August 28, 1989) is a Canadian curler originally from Charlottetown, Prince Edward Island. He currently skips his own team.

Career
As a junior, Casey played in Prince Edward Island as the third on the Brett Gallant junior men's team. As a member of the team, Casey won 5 straight provincial junior championships from 2006 to 2010 inclusively. In 2007, they won a bronze medal at the Canada Winter Games.  The team won the 2009 Canadian Junior Curling Championships and won a silver medal at the 2009 World Junior Curling Championships.

After juniors in 2010, Casey moved to Nova Scotia to play third for the Chris Sutherland rink. The team made it to the 2011 Nova Scotia Men's Molson Provincial Championship, but they were eliminated before the playoffs.

After the season, it was announced that Casey would join the Newfoundland-based Brad Gushue rink, as the team's second. The team easily won the 2012 Newfoundland and Labrador Tankard, giving Casey the trip to his first Brier. While playing for Gushue in Newfoundland, Casey continued his Industrial Engineering studies at Dalhousie University in Halifax, completing his work by correspondence.

He left the Gushue rink in 2014 to form his own rink, consisting of third Josh Barry, second Anson Carmody, and lead Robbie Doherty.

In 2020 Casey joined Ryan Fry as the only curlers to represent four provinces at the Brier, playing second for Jason Gunnlaugson's Manitoba rink.

Personal life
Casey currently serves as director, operations at MDS Coating. He is married and has a son and a daughter. He currently lives in Charlottetown.

Grand Slam record

References

External links

Living people
1989 births
Sportspeople from St. John's, Newfoundland and Labrador
Sportspeople from Charlottetown
Curlers from Prince Edward Island
Curlers from Nova Scotia
Curlers from Newfoundland and Labrador
Curlers from Ontario
People from Prince County, Prince Edward Island
Canadian male curlers
Canada Cup (curling) participants